Escholzmatt-Marbach is a municipality in the district of Entlebuch in the canton of Lucerne in Switzerland.  On 1 January 2013 the former municipalities of Escholzmatt and Marbach merged to form the new municipality of Escholzmatt-Marbach.

History
Escholzmatt is first mentioned in 1160 as Askolvismatte.  In 1240 it was mentioned as Askoltispach and Asholtismate, in 1275 it was mentioned as Aeschelsmat.  Marbach is first mentioned in 1306 as Marpach.

Geography

Of this area, 50% is used for agricultural purposes, while 44.1% is forested. Of the rest of the land, 3.1% is settled (buildings or roads) and the remainder (2.7%) is non-productive (rivers, glaciers or mountains). The former municipality is located on the watershed between the Grosse and Kleine Emme rivers. It consists of the village of Escholzmatt and the hamlets of Lehn, Feldmoos, Wiggen, and Dürrenbach.

Of this area, 45.3% is used for agricultural purposes, while 47.4% is forested. Of the rest of the land, 2.6% is settled (buildings or roads) and the remainder (4.7%) is non-productive (rivers, glaciers or mountains). The former municipality is located in the southwest corner of the Canton.

Demographics

Historic population
The historical population is given in the following chart:

Weather

Escholzmatt has an average of 153 days of rain per year and on average receives  of precipitation. During this month there is precipitation for an average of 15.1 days. The month with the most days of precipitation is May, with an average of 15.5, but with only  of precipitation.

Marbach has an average of 162.3 days of rain per year and on average receives  of precipitation. During this month there is precipitation for an average of 16.4 days. The month with the most days of precipitation is May, with an average of 16.9, but with only  of precipitation.

References

External links

Municipalities of the canton of Lucerne